San Mateo High School is a National Blue Ribbon comprehensive four-year public high school in San Mateo, California, United States. It serves grades 9–12 and is part of the San Mateo Union High School District.

History
In its first year, San Mateo High School was located in the Dixon Cottage on Ellsworth Avenue with an enrollment of just 14 students. The faculty was composed of A.G. Van Gorder, principal and teacher; and Marie Borough and Florence Kimball, two assistant teachers. The school was opened on September 15, 1902, at 8:30 am, in the two-story Dixon Cottage at 54 North Ellsworth Street. Its courses included foreign languages, the arts, history, and varied courses in science and mathematics. In the beginning, only two years were required for graduation, but many students continued the full four years with intentions of going to college. Textbooks were well preserved, as the students had to buy their own. Reimbursement could usually be had by selling the used books to the incoming freshmen.

Princeton University, with the colors orange and black, was "King of Sports" in 1902. Following suit, San Mateo High chose the orange and black as its colors, and set its own words to the music of Princeton's school song.

Early in 1903, the high school on Ellsworth Street became too small to accommodate the increased enrollment, which was then 27. Following a bond election, the Board of Education appropriated $24,000 for the purchase of Brewer Tract, which housed Saint Margaret's School for Girls. This was a three-story structure situated on the corner of Baldwin Avenue and San Mateo Drive. During the summer, in addition to remodeling and refurnishing the building, a new chemistry laboratory was constructed and supplied at a cost of $270. SMHS also gained a set of reference books at $75 and three Remington typewriters at $70 each. Classes were conducted in this building from 1903 until 1911.

Although the school building was considerably damaged in the earthquake of 1906, no class time was lost. The building was one of the first to be repaired after the earthquake.

By 1907 there were 90 students enrolled. In 1906, all of the academic departments were accredited by the University of California, Berkeley. Since then, San Mateo High School has been recognized as a leading institution of learning in the San Mateo community. In 1991, the school was named a National Blue Ribbon School by the United States Department of Education. In 2005, it was recognized with a Gold Standard Award for Academic Excellence by California Business for Education Excellence (CBEE) in conjunction with the California State University system. This award recognizes only ten California high schools which have shown measurable gains and strong academic performance by preparing students for college and the workforce, while showing evidence of reducing achievement gaps between various subgroups of students over time.

The first graduates of San Mateo High left their school days behind to take part in the leadership of the twentieth century on June 5, 1905. The students of the first class included Elizabeth Dingwell; Emily Donnelly; Kenneth Green, salutatorian; Freda Hagerup, valedictorian; Eva Leavy; Mabel Moore; and Lena Sullivan.

On February 4, 1911, a notice appeared in the San Mateo Times stating that the new San Mateo High School building on the Baldwin Avenue campus was almost completed. On May 5, the new structure was formally opened. At the dedication ceremony, a copper box containing autographed signatures of the High School Board; the faculty and students; the grammar school teachers; the county, town, and grammar school district officials; copies of The Elm; a directory of all the high schools in the state; and pictures of SMHS in all its stages of development from 1902-1911 was placed in the cornerstone to be preserved for all time.

On December 3, a $50,000 school bond was passed by a vote of 394 "yes" and 124 "no", enabling the board, under President J. C. Robb, to award and make payment on bids to the tune of $92,268 covering the building, heating, plumbing, painting, and electrical wiring in the new school.

In the years 1920-1921, approximately 500 students were enrolled in the daytime school, which had a capacity of 350. Therefore, larger classes and fewer courses were offered, with less individual attention given by the teachers. A committee was formed to investigate keeping the present campus and getting land in the north for a school or obtaining land for one school for the entire district. To help with the problem of a crowded school, the board passed a motion to build a temporary building to house band, music, printing, and two recitation rooms. This was erected between the tennis courts and the retaining wall, shops and the rear of the main building.

The following year, more than 500 students registered at SMHS during the first week of the fall semester. The Baldwin Avenue school was designed for only 400; the main building consisted 11 classrooms, and five classrooms in temporary buildings housed the music, print shop, and history departments. In some cases, it was necessary for 50 students to occupy a room built for 25. Yet the first bond issue for Burlingame High School was defeated because it lacked the necessary two-thirds majority. The school board immediately called for a new bond election for $360,000 to be held November 12, 1921; $60,000 was for land and the rest for the building and furnishings. After a vigorous campaign, highlighted by a mass meeting on November 9, called by Major W. H. Pearson of Burlingame, the issue passed 1710-280. On April 5, 1922, ground was broken for Burlingame High School. On December 20, 1923, about 1,000 people attended the formal dedication of Burlingame High School. It should be mentioned, however, that Burlingame and San Mateo High Schools remained as one student body under one set of student body officers. Early in the spring of 1927, the Board of Trustees ordered San Mateo High to split into two units, to establish separate student bodies: San Mateo and Burlingame High Schools, with their own activities and teams.

In the fall of 1927, the present San Mateo High School Delaware campus was completed. The $600,000 school, designed by architects John E. and E. L. Norberg, consisted of a main and an art building and a boys' gym. The new facility followed the architectural model of Henry VIII's Hampton Court in England. On November 10, the first anniversary of the laying of the cornerstone, the new T-shaped main building was dedicated and featured the state's most complete science departments with experimental switchboards, fume cabinets, and a greenhouse over the biology rooms; a print shop that handled printing for both high schools and the junior college (now College of San Mateo); a Tudor design library; and a dumbwaiter for fast communication between the principal's office and the superintendent's office on the second floor. A clock tower looming above the main entrance boasted the only set of chimes in a high school in the state. The $115,000 chimes were presented by Mrs. Charles S. Howard in memory of her son. With San Mateo and Burlingame high schools officially separated, students in the two cities were committed to attend their respective schools. The school was structurally reinforced for earthquake safety measures in 1934-1935 and then was entirely renovated for earthquake safety in 2005.

After the 2005 rebuild of the school, it did not retain the original T-shaped form but rather a U-shaped design that houses the "A", "B", "C", "D" buildings along with isolated "E" and Music buildings. The A-building houses Administration, World Languages, Social Sciences, Photography, Digital Media, Directed Studies, Student Government, Renaissance Leadership, and some English and Mathematics. The B-building houses just English, with the library occupying the bottom floor; it has a dedicated Media Lab for Journalism and Yearbook. The C-building contains all Science classes (except Biotechnology), a few Mathematics classes, and also consists of one California Technical Education class, Food and Nutrition. The D-building is a state-of-the-art addition to the Biotechnology Training Facility wing that was completed in November 2010. The E-building houses the pool area, sports trainer offices, Small Gym, and Health courses. The Music Building, built in 1927, is still in its original location and houses Band, Choir, and Music courses. In addition, the campus has tennis courts; an all-weather football, soccer, and track and field stadium; baseball and softball fields; and a large Main Gym with dance studios built in 2003 that is used for Physical Education courses, dance instruction, after-school sports, and school rallies.

The school earned a Guinness World Record in 2005 for collecting 372,000 pounds (168,736 kg) of food from the local community for its annual canned food drive. The collected food was donated to Second Harvest Food Bank and Samaritan House, which provides to all of the needy families all throughout San Mateo and Santa Clara counties during the holiday season.

Campus

The school moved twice in 1903, and then to Baldwin Avenue in 1911, before moving to its present location on Delaware Street in 1927. In 2001, the school demolished and entirely replaced the original building in an effort to meet modern earthquake safety requirements. Dedicated in August 2005, the new building strongly echoes the design and materials of the original in part due to strong public outcry about the decision to demolish the structure.  On February 10, 2006, the campus quad was dedicated to alumnus Merv Griffin, who donated $250,000 to the school ($125,000 of which was intended for the performing arts department). The Merv Griffin Quad sits squarely in the center of the campus and student life at San Mateo High. It includes an amphitheater built in the Greek-style and the Thomas Mohr clock tower, named after a longtime district superintendent and reminiscent of the tower and chimes that were removed from the building during the 1934–1935 structural reinforcements. The courtyard is a popular gathering place for students during lunchtime and rallies.

Efforts to improve the school's educational facilities, while preserving its unique heritage, are ongoing. The Performing Arts Center, which is shared with county-wide performing arts groups and seats 1,540 people, completed a $26.5 million renovation in 2013. The smaller Flex Theatre was built with District and Drama Booster funds in 1993.

During the 2005 rebuilding process, the original library was recreated, maintaining its signature fireplace and mantel and high ceilings. It affords a panoramic view of the center courtyard of the school.

Other improvements to the school have occurred since the 2002 Centennial including transformation of the main athletic stadium with all-weather surfaces for football and soccer and an eight-lane all-weather track, remodeling of the swimming pool in 2003–2005, an expanded weight room, and the building of a joint-use Community Gym housing the wrestling and dance rooms and a full-court basketball area.

Grades
The academic calendar consists of two semesters of 18 weeks each. Classes (excluding 0th and 8th period) regularly meet three times a week, twice for 91-minute block periods and for 51-minute periods on Mondays.  As of the 2012-13 school year, 51-minute periods were switched to Mondays. Each course has a value of five credits per semester. Grading is on a 4.0 point scale. Grade point average and class rank (unweighted) are computed in January of the senior year. All courses taken in 9th, 10th, and 11th and first semester of the 12th grade, including PE are used for final transcripts. The Canvas system is actively used by a majority of the staff for students and parents that displays assignments for the students.

In 2009, 266 students took the Advance Placement (AP) exams with a 79% pass rate (score of 3 or higher).

Academic reputation
In 2017 San Mateo High School was ranked the 50th best high school in California by Niche  In 2015 it was ranked the 216th best public high school in the country by Newsweek.  In 2013 it was ranked 376th nationally by The Washington Posts ranking of "America's Most Challenging High Schools."

Statistics

Demographics
2017-2018
 1,665 students: 832 male (50.0%), 833 female (50.0%)  

Approximately 36.5% of the students at San Mateo High are served by the free or reduced-price lunch program.

Standardized testing

Extracurricular activities

Biotechnology program

San Mateo High School has a recognized biotechnology program. The recently built $9.2 million biotechnology wing features  of instructional space on the ground floor, an 18-station laboratory, a bio-manufacturing room and independent research laboratory, a plant tissue culture facility, a chemical stockroom and storage area, a bio-imaging room, computer research area, and a student conference area. The second floor boasts a  conference room and distance learning facility to host guest speakers and facilitate video conferencing. Upstairs also has a spot for a greenhouse, long-term storage and staff offices.

Journalism program

The San Mateo Hi is San Mateo High School's school print publication. It is one of the longest-running student journalism programs on the West Coast and prints 16 broadsheet pages once every month. In its 2008–2009 run, the paper won numerous accolades at the Peninsula Press Club High School Newspaper Competition.

In addition to the Hi, Mateo Journalism also maintains an award-winning website, the "Bearcat".

Music

San Mateo High School has Concert Band, Symphonic Band, Jazz Band, Marching Band, Advanced Orchestra (Bella Sinfonia), and Choir courses available.

Sports

The school's traditional arch-rival is Burlingame High School, which originated as a branch of San Mateo High in 1923. Near the end of the football season, the two schools hold an annual "Little Big Game," patterned after the collegiate Big Game. San Mateo last won the Little Big Game and "The Paw" trophy in 2009. As of April 2021, Burlingame leads the series record 57–32–4.

After a move to the Bay Division, the varsity soccer team won its first Division II CCS title in history in 2012 as well as the league championship.

Notable alumni

 Walter Afanasieff, Grammy-winning music composer and producer
 George Archer, Professional Golfer winner of the 1969 Masters Tournament
 David Binn, 1990, 18-season NFL player
 Keith Birlem, American football player
 Jonah Blechman, 1993, actor, This Boy's Life
 Barry Bostwick, 1964, actor and singer, Spin City
 Ted Dabney, 1955, co-founder of Atari
 Eric Dane, 1991, actor, Euphoria & Grey's Anatomy
 Richard K. Diran, expatriate adventurer, photographer
 Fred Dutton, 1941, Democratic Party political advisor, originator of the idea for Earth Day
 Phil Goldman, 1982, WebTV founder
 Merv Griffin, 1942. entertainment producer and former talk show host
 Dennis Haysbert, 1972, actor of film and television, 24
 Claire Giannini Hoffman, 1922, first woman to serve on the boards of Bank of America and Sears, Roebuck & Company
 Wagner Jorgensen, football player
 Kris Kristofferson, 1954, writer, singer-songwriter, actor, and musician
 Lee Mendelson, five-time Emmy-winning producer of Peanuts
 Bill Neukom, 1959. Managing General Partner of the San Francisco Giants
 Arron Oberholser, professional golfer
 Amanda Perez, 2012, professional football player, Mexico
 Bob Peterson, NBA player
 Alicia Silverstone, Actress, Clueless
 Michael Allen, Professional golfer, Winner 2009 Sr PGA Championship
 Peter Thiel, (1985), tech startup entrepreneur, billionaire, co-founder of PayPal
 James Swett, (1939), U.S. Marine Corps fighter pilot; awarded Medal of Honor, 1943
 Debi Thomas, bronze medalist in figure skating at the 1988 Winter Olympics
 Cal Tjader, 1943, Latin jazz musician

See also

San Mateo County high schools

References

External links
San Mateo High School official website

Educational institutions established in 1902
High schools in San Mateo County, California
San Mateo, California
Public high schools in California
1902 establishments in California